Gejza Josipović (31 January 1857 – 20 May 1934) was a Croatian politician of the Unionist Party who served as Minister without portfolio of Croatian Affairs twice: between 1906–1910 and between 1912 and 1913. His father was Emerik Josipović, who also served in this position. Gejza graduated in the Budapest University's Faculty of Law. He participated in the occupation of Bosnia and Herzegovina. In 1887 he became a member of the Croatian Parliament. After the Treaty of Trianon he lived in Hungary.

References
 Magyar Életrajzi Lexikon

Croatian politicians
1857 births
1934 deaths
Ministers of Croatian Affairs of Hungary